Events in the year 1985 in Japan which correspond to Shōwa 60 (昭和60年) in the Japanese calendar.

Incumbents
Emperor: Hirohito (Emperor Shōwa)
Prime Minister: Yasuhiro Nakasone (L–Gunma, 2nd term)
 Chief Cabinet Secretary: Takao Fujinami (L–Mie) until December 28, Masaharu Gotōda (L–Tokushima)
 Chief Justice of the Supreme Court: Jirō Terata until November 3, Kōichi Yaguchi from November 5
 President of the House of Representatives: Kenji Fukunaga (L–Saitama) until January 24, Michita Sakata (L–Kumamoto)
 President of the House of Councillors: Mutsuo Kimura (L–Okayama)
 Diet sessions: 102nd (regular session opened in December 1984, to June 25), 103rd (extraordinary, October 14 to December 21), 104th (regular, December 24 to 1986, May 22)

Governors
Aichi Prefecture: Reiji Suzuki 
Akita Prefecture: Kikuji Sasaki 
Aomori Prefecture: Masaya Kitamura 
Chiba Prefecture: Takeshi Numata 
Ehime Prefecture: Haruki Shiraishi 
Fukui Prefecture: Heidayū Nakagawa 
Fukuoka Prefecture: Hachiji Okuda 
Fukushima Prefecture: Isao Matsudaira 
Gifu Prefecture: Yosuke Uematsu 
Gunma Prefecture: Ichiro Shimizu 
Hiroshima Prefecture: Toranosuke Takeshita 
Hokkaido: Takahiro Yokomichi 
Hyogo Prefecture: Tokitada Sakai
Ibaraki Prefecture: Fujio Takeuchi 
Ishikawa Prefecture: Yōichi Nakanishi 
Iwate Prefecture:   
Kagawa Prefecture: Tadao Maekawa 
Kagoshima Prefecture: Kaname Kamada 
Kanagawa Prefecture: Kazuji Nagasu 
Kochi Prefecture: Chikara Nakauchi  
Kumamoto Prefecture: Morihiro Hosokawa 
Kyoto Prefecture: Yukio Hayashida 
Mie Prefecture: Ryōzō Tagawa 
Miyagi Prefecture: Sōichirō Yamamoto 
Miyazaki Prefecture: Suketaka Matsukata 
Nagano Prefecture: Gorō Yoshimura 
Nagasaki Prefecture: Isamu Takada 
Nara Prefecture: Shigekiyo Ueda 
Niigata Prefecture: Takeo Kimi 
Oita Prefecture: Morihiko Hiramatsu 
Okayama Prefecture: Shiro Nagano 
Okinawa Prefecture: Junji Nishime 
Osaka Prefecture: Sakae Kishi
Saga Prefecture: Kumao Katsuki 
Saitama Prefecture: Yawara Hata 
Shiga Prefecture: Masayoshi Takemura 
Shiname Prefecture: Seiji Tsunematsu 
Shizuoka Prefecture: Keizaburō Yamamoto 
Tochigi Prefecture: Fumio Watanabe
Tokushima Prefecture: Shinzo Miki 
Tokyo: Shun'ichi Suzuki 
Tottori Prefecture: Yuji Nishio 
Toyama Prefecture: Yutaka Nakaoki
Wakayama Prefecture: Shirō Kariya  
Yamagata Prefecture: Seiichirō Itagaki 
Yamaguchi Prefecture: Toru Hirai 
Yamanashi Prefecture: Kōmei Mochizuki

Events

January 28 – twenty-five people were killed when a charter bus carrying students on a ski tour plunged into a river in Nagano.
March 17 — September 16 – Expo '85 was held at the Tsukuba, Ibaraki prefecture.
May 17 – sixty-two people were killed after a gas explosion in a Mitsubishi Yubari coal mine, located in Yubari, Hokkaido.
June 23 – 1985 Narita International Airport bombing; two people were killed.
August 12 – Japan Airlines Flight 123 crashed into Mount Takamagahara. All fifteen crew members and five hundred-five passengers died.
September 13 - Super Mario Bros. was released.

Popular culture

Arts and entertainment

 Film: Gray Sunset, directed by Shunya Ito, won the Best Film award at the Japan Academy Prize. Ran won Best film at the Blue Ribbon Awards. Sorekara won Best film at the Hochi Film Awards and Love Hotel won Best film at the Yokohama Film Festival. For a list of Japanese films released in 1985, please see Japanese films of 1985.
 Manga: Bari Bari Densetsu by Shuichi Shigeno (shōnen) and Okashina Futari by Jūzō Yamasaki and Kei Sadayasu and Mahiro Taiken by Naomi Nishi (both tied for general manga) won the Kodansha Manga Award. The winners of the Shogakukan Manga Award were Bokkemon by Takashi Iwashige (general), Hatsukoi Scandal and Tobe! Jinrui II by Akira Oze (shōnen), Zenryaku Milk House by Yumiko Kawahara (shōjo) and Asari-chan by Mayumi Muroyama (children). Appleseed by Masamune Shirow won the Seiun Award for Best Comic of the Year.
 Music: the Red Team won the 36th Kōhaku Uta Gassen. They were: Hidemi Ishikawa, Naoko Kawai, Teresa Teng, Kyōko Koizumi, Yoshie Kashiwabara, Hiromi Iwasaki, Akina Nakamori, Rumiko Koyanagi, Naoko Ken, Nobue Matsuhara, Yū Hayami, Seiko Matsuda, Tomoyo Harada, Miyuki Kawanaka, Kyoko Suizenji, Chiyoko Shimakura, Aki Yashiro, Sayuri Ishikawa, Sachiko Kobayashi and Masako Mori. Masahiko Kondō won the Japan Music Awards and the Nippon Television Music Festival. Akina Nakamori won the 27th Japan Record Awards and the FNS Music Festival with the song Meu amor é. The May edition of the Yamaha Popular Song Contest was won by ROLL-BACK with the song You & Me Tonight.
Japan hosted the Miss International 1985 beauty pageant, won by Nina Sicilia from Venezuela.

Sports

 Japan hosted the 1985 Summer Universiade, where the country placed 6th with a total of 16 medals, 6 of which were gold. The Soviet Union had the highest total number of  medals with 84, and the highest number of gold medals with 42.
 In badminton, Japan hosted the 1985 World Badminton Grand Prix, won by Han Jian (men's singles) and Li Lingwei (women's singles), both from China. At the Japanese National Badminton Championships, Hiroyuki Hasegawa won the Men's singles, Sumiko Kitada the Women's singles, Shinji Matsuura and Shūji Matsuno the Men's doubles, Kazuko Takamine and Kazue Hoshi the Women's doubles and Akio Tomita and Michiko Tomita the Mixed doubles.
 In baseball, the Hanshin Tigers won the 1985 Japan Series against the Seibu Lions. The MVP in the Central League was Randy Bass and in the Pacific League Hiromitsu Ochiai.
 In basketball, the All Japan Intercollegiate Basketball Championship was won by Nippon Sport Science.
 In figure skating, Japan hosted the 1985 World Figure Skating Championships, with the Soviet Union topping the medals table with the most gold and overall total medals. The winners of the 1984–1985 Japan Figure Skating Championships were Masaru Ogawa (men), Midori Ito (women) and Noriko Sato and Tadayuki Takahashi in ice dancing.
 In football (soccer), Japan hosted the final of the 1985 Intercontinental Cup between Juventus F.C. and Argentinos Juniors, which Juventus won in a 4-2 penalty shootout. Furukawa Electric (currently the JEF United Ichihara Chiba) won the 1985–86 Japan Soccer League. Nissan Motor Company (currently the Yokohama F. Marinos) won the Emperor's Cup. For the champions of the regional leagues see: Japanese Regional Leagues 1985.
 In judo, Japan hosted the 1985 Asian Judo Championships and topped the medals table with the most gold and overall total medals tied with China.
 In rugby union, Ireland toured Japan.
 In swimming, Japan hosted the first Pan Pacific Swimming Championships.
 In tennis, Japan hosted the 1985 Federation Cup, won by Czechoslovakia.

Births
January 5 – Yuka Koide, model and actress
January 11 – Rie fu, singer-songwriter
January 17 – Riyu Kosaka, J-pop singer
January 20 – Marina Inoue, voice actress and singer
January 22 – Akira Nagata, singer (Run&Gun), actor and voice actor
January 28 – Aya Miyama, football player
January 29
Joji Takeuchi, basketball player
Kosuke Takeuchi, basketball player
February 6
Joji Kato, speedskater
Saki Kagami, actress
February 17 – Hiroko Sato, actress, singer
February 28 – Rin Aoki, model and AV actress
March 6 - Maya Nakanishi, Paralympic athlete
March 8 – Mio Takeuchi, actress
March 24 
 Haruka Ayase, actress
 Sayaka Hirano, table tennis player
March 25 – Yūsuke Kobayashi, Japanese voice actor
March 28 – Akiko Suzuki, figure skater
April 9 – Tomohisa Yamashita, idol, singer
April 21 – Takuro Fujii, swimmer
April 24 — Kaori Nazuka, voice actress
April 26 – Adachi Yurie, ice hockey player
May 5 – Shoko Nakagawa, actress, voice actress and singer
May 11 – Sifow, singer
May 13 – Yusuke Minato, Nordic combined skier
May 29 
 Nozomi Komuro, skeleton racer
 Yukihiro Takiguchi, Japanese actor, singer and model (d. 2019)
June 2 — Miyuki Sawashiro, voice actress
June 7 — Marie Miyake, voice actress
June 19 – Ai Miyazato, golfer
June 22 — Rosa Kato, actress and model
June 23 — Kavka Shishido, drummer and vocalist
June 27 – Hiroyuki Taniguchi, football player
July 3 – Keisuke Minami, actor, singer
July 11
Aki Maeda, actress, singer
Takahisa Nishiyama, football player
July 16
 Yōko Hikasa, Japanese actress
 Hiroyuki Onoue, Japanese actor
July 22 – Akira Tozawa, professional wrestler
August 17 — Yū Aoi, actress and model
August 25 – Naho Emoto, baseball player
September 1 – Kosuke Nakamachi, football player
September 2 – Hiroyuki Oze, baseball player (d. 2010)
September 3 – Yūki Kaji, voice actor
September 10
Aya Kamiki, singer
Shota Matsuda, actor
September 11 – Kazutaka Murase, football player
September 13 – Emi Suzuki, Chinese-born Japanese female model 
September 20 – Mami Yamasaki, gravure idol
September 23 – Maki Goto, singer, lyricist and former actress
September 24 – Yōhei Kajiyama, football player
September 25 – Asami Tanno, sprinter
October 3 – Megumi Takamoto, voice actress and singer
October 6 – Yasuharu Nanri, figure skater
October 8 – Eiji Wentz, singer, entertainer, and actor
October 13 – Yoshihisa Naruse, baseball player
October 18 – Iori Nomizu, voice actress, actress and singer
October 21 – Yasuhiro Inaba, freestyle wrestler
October 22
 Manpei Takagi, actor
 Shinpei Takagi, actor
November 18 – Hiromi Miyake, weightlifter
November 25 – Masatsugu Kawachi, boxer
November 30
Hikari Mitsushima, actress, singer
Aoi Miyazaki, actress
December 14 
 Katsuya Kitamura, wrestler  (d. 2022)
 Nonami Takizawa, actress
December 15 – Madoka Harada, luger
December 16 – Keita Tachibana, singer
December 22 – Yuta Ikeda, golfer
December 26 – Yuu Shirota, actor
December 27 – Daiki Ito, ski jumper

Unknown date

Deaths

January 9 – Nichidatsu Fujii, Buddhist monk (b. 1885)
January 27 – Masahisa Takenaka, 4th  of the Yamaguchi-gumi (b. 1933)
January 31 – Tatsuzō Ishikawa, novelist (b. 1905)
March 30
Kenkichi Oshima, athlete (b. 1908)
Yaeko Nogami, author (b. 1885)
Shizuko Kasagi, singer (b. 1914)
April 12 – Seiji Miyaguchi, actor (b. 1913)
June 9 – Matsutarō Kawaguchi, novelist (b. 1899)
June 24 – Kuninori Marumo, admiral in the Imperial Japanese Navy (b. 1891)
July 7 – Shōzō Sakurai, general (b. 1899)
August 12 – Kyu Sakamoto, singer and actor (b. 1941)
August 17 – Matsuo Kishi, film critic, filmmaker (b. 1906)
September 11 – Masako Natsume, model and actress (b. 1957)
September 27 – Ryūtarō Ōtomo, film actor (b. 1912)
October 13 – Eiji Kanie, voice actor (b. 1941)
October 21 – Masuiyama Daishirō I, sumo wrestler (b. 1919)
October 26 – Kikuko Kawakami, author (b. 1904)
November 1 – Ōuchiyama Heikichi, sumo wrestler (b. 1926)
December 21 – Kamatari Fujiwara, actor (b. 1905)
December 24 – Kouzou Sasaki, politician, chairman of the Japan Socialist Party (b. 1900)

See also
 1985 in Japanese television
 List of Japanese films of 1985

References

 
Japan
Years of the 20th century in Japan